Madame may refer to:

 Madam, civility title or form of address for women, derived from the French 
 Madam (prostitution), a term for a woman who is engaged in the business of procuring prostitutes, usually the manager of a brothel
 Madame (1961 film), a Spanish-Italian-French film
 Madame (2017 film), a French comedy-drama film
 Madame (singer) (born 2002), Italian singer and rapper
 Madame, puppet made famous by entertainer Wayland Flowers
 Madame's Place, a 1982 sitcom starring Madame
 Madame (clothing), an Indian clothing company

Places
 Île Madame, French island on the Atlantic coast
 Palazzo Madama, seat of the Senate of the Italian Republic in Rome
 Palazzo Madama, Turin, Italian palace

See also
 Madam (disambiguation)